XESAL-AM was a radio station serving Saltillo, Coahuila, Mexico, owned by the Universidad Autónoma Agraria Antonio Narro (UAAAN). Broadcasting on 1220 kHz, XESAL was a daytime-only radio station known as Radio Universidad Agraria.

The UAAAN failed to renew the permit for XESAL-AM in 2012, and the station is currently considered unlicensed.

XESAL-AM had to leave the air during night hours to prevent interference with XEB, the Class A station on 1220 AM.

References

Spanish-language radio stations
Radio stations in Coahuila
Mass media in Saltillo
University radio stations in Mexico